Forced Entry may refer to:

Forced entry (or forcible entry): entering into property, lawfully or unlawfully, by use of force

In film:
Forced Entry (1973 film), a pornographic film
Forced Entry (1975 film), a horror film remake of the 1973 film
Forced Entry (2002 film), a pornographic film released by Extreme Associates
Forced Entry, a 2007 pornographic film starring Rod Barry
Forced Entry, a short film by Brooke "Mikey" Anderson

In music:
Forced Entry (band), a thrash metal band

In television:
"Forced Entry" (CSI: Miami), an episode
"Forced Entry" (NCIS), an episode

In computer security:
 FORCEDENTRY, a spyware component